St. Mary's Orthodox Church may refer to:

St. Mary's Coptic Orthodox Church Massarra, Egypt
St Mary's Orthodox Church, Kallooppara, India
St. Mary's Orthodox Church, Maikavu, India
St. Mary's Orthodox Valiyapally, India
St. Mary's Orthodox Church (West Virginia), USA
St. Mary Coptic Orthodox Church (Lancaster, Pennsylvania), USA